People for Cattle in India (PFCI) is a non-governmental organisation and nonprofit organisation focusing on illegal cattle trafficking and slaughtering. PFCI has saved more than 1000 cattle lives in India.

PFCI has been closely working with various government, NGOs (non-government organisations), SHGs (self help groups) and CBOs (community-based organisations).

The organisation was founded on 22 October 2012 by G. Arun Prasanna, a well-known animal activist.

The organisation states its mission statement thus:

See also
 Animal rescue group

References

Notes

Further reading

 People for Cattle in India's official web page
 Petition filed by PFCI before National Green Tribunal
 PFCI against Illegal Cattle Trafficking & Slaughter in The Hindu
 Ban illegal cattle slaughter
 Cattle rescued by PFCI volunteers
 Traffickers use chilli paste to torture animals
 Camel rescue attempt by PFCI
 Camel rescue attempt by PFCI
 12th rescue operation of cattle by PFCI
 Cruelty on the rise
 25 cattle rescued by PFCI in Avinashi
Rights panel takes up animals cause 
Activist says all rules are flouted while transporting animals

2012 establishments in India
Animal charities based in India
Animal rescue groups
Organizations established in 2012